Dinosaur Valley State Park is a state park near Glen Rose, Texas, United States.

History 
Dinosaur Valley State Park, located just northwest of Glen Rose in Somervell County, Texas, is a  scenic park set astride the Paluxy River. The land for the park was acquired from private owners under the State Parks Bonds Program during 1968 and opened to the public in 1972.  In addition to being a state park, it is also a National Natural Landmark.

Eastward-dipping limestones, sandstones, and mudstones of the Glen Rose Formation were deposited during the early Cretaceous Period approximately 113 million years ago along the shorelines of an ancient sea, and form the geological setting for the park area. Over the last million years or so, these layered formations have been eroded, dissected and sculpted by the Paluxy River which, in many places, has cut down to resistant beds and planed off sizable exposures of rock in the river bottom.

Controversy 
Near Dinosaur Valley State Park, in the limestone deposits along the Paluxy River, "twin sets" of tracks were found in the Glen Rose Formation as early as 1908. These footprints were once thought to be evidence that humans and non-avian dinosaurs lived at the same time, but now are identified to be created by dinosaurs.  However, young-Earth creationists continue to believe that humans and non-avian dinosaurs lived at the same time, a notion that is contrary to the standard view of the geological time scale. Biologist Massimo Pigliucci has noted that geologists in the 1980s "clearly demonstrated that no human being left those prints," but rather "they were in fact metatarsal dinosaur tracks, together with a few pure and simple fakes."

The family of George Adams, who claimed to have found human footprints in the Glen Rose Formation, later admitted that Adams' and some others' fossil footprints were a hoax. Zana Douglas, the granddaughter of George Adams, explained that during the 1930s' Great Depression her grandfather and other residents of Glen Rose made money by making moonshine and selling "dinosaur fossils". The faux fossils brought $15 to $30 and when the supply ran low, they "just carved more, some with human footprints thrown in."

See also

 Geology
 Paleontology
 Trace fossil
 Sedimentary structures
 List of Texas state parks

References

External links 

 Dinosaur Valley State Park, official website
 A guide to the state park by Glen J. Kuban.
 The Texas Dinosaur/"Man Track" Controversy by Glen J. Kuban from talk.origins
Film footage of Dinosaur Valley State Park from Texas: The Beginnings, Part I on the Texas Archive of the Moving Image

Fossil parks in the United States
Fossil trackways in the United States
Cross country running courses in Texas
Dinosaur museums in the United States
IUCN Category III
Museums in Somervell County, Texas
National Natural Landmarks in Texas
Natural history museums in Texas
Protected areas of Somervell County, Texas
Paleontology in Texas
State parks of Texas
1968 in paleontology
1972 establishments in Texas
Protected areas established in 1972